The Bücker Bü 133 Jungmeister was an advanced trainer of the Luftwaffe in the 1930s. It was a single-engine, single-seat biplane of wood and tubular steel construction and covered in fabric.

Development
The Bü 133 was a development of the Bücker Bü 131 Jungmann two-seat basic trainer. First flown in 1935 (by Luise Hoffmann, the first female works pilot in Germany), it was slightly smaller than the Bü 131. The prototype, D-EVEO, was powered by a  Hirth HM506 inverted, air-cooled inline-6 engine.

The aircraft showed "astonishing agility" at its first public appearance, the 1936 International Aerobatic Championship at Rangsdorf, but the Bü 133A garnered no orders; only two Bü 133Bs, with  Siemens-Halske Sh.14A-4 radial engines, were built.

The main production type was the  Siemens-Bramo Sh 14A radial powered Bü 133C, which had a distinctive cowling and a -shorter fuselage, and the same fine aerobatic performance as the Bü 133A.

Fifty-two were manufactured under licence by Dornier Flugzeugwerke for the Swiss Air Force (which kept it in service until 1968). Twenty five Jungmeisters, initially powered by Hirth HM506 engines, were licence-built for the Spanish Air Force from 1940–42 by CASA with the designation CASA 1-133L, although they were later re-engined with Sh 14 engines. They joined the survivors of 22 German-built Bü-133Cs in Spanish service.

In the 1960s, the American pilot Jack Canary obtained construction plans for the Bü-133 from Spain and a production licence from Carl Bücker, with the intention of restarting production of the Jungmeister in Germany to meet an expected high demand from the USA. The first new-build aircraft was completed by the Wolf Hirth factory at Nabern being completed in 1968. Jack Canary was killed later that year during the production of the film Tora! Tora! Tora!, however, and his death caused the project to lose momentum, with poor sales (partly due to the high cost of the new-build aircraft together with the availability of ex-Swiss Jungmeisters on the civil market) caused Hirth to stop production in 1971 after four aircraft has been built. Several aircraft were later completed from components built during this project, with two aircraft built in Austria in the 1970s, one built in France in 1991 and another completed by Hirth in 1991.

Operational history

The Bü 133C racked up numerous victories in international aerobatic competition, and by 1938 was the Luftwaffes standard advanced trainer. At the Brussels meet that year, a three-man Luftwaffe team made a strong impression on Reichsmarschall Hermann Göring, who ordered a nine-man team be formed. It dazzled the crowds at the International Flying meet in Brussels the next year.

The Jungmeister design remained competitive in international aerobatic competition into the 1960s.

Variants
Bücker Bü 133A First prototype - initially powered by  Hirth HM 6 inline engine as Bü 133 A-1. Later rebuilt with  Hirth HM 506A.
Bücker Bü 133B Proposed version with  Argus As 8 engine. Unbuilt.
Bücker Bü 133C  Siemens-Halske Sh 14A engine.
Bücker Bü 133D Improved production version using roller bearings for rudder, powered by Sh 14A engine.
CASA 1.133 Spanish-built variant.
Price/American Tiger Club Jungmeister Plans for homebuilt construction.
SSH Bü 133 Jungmeister Reproduction Jungmeister by SSH in Poland.

Operators

Zrakoplovstvo Nezavisne Države Hrvatske

Luftwaffe

Hungarian Air Force

Lithuanian Air Force (6 acquired in 1939)
Aeroclub of Lithuania (2 units)

Polish Air Force (1 bought for tests before 1939)
   
 Romanian Air Force 

 Slovak Air Force (1939-1945)
 Spanish Republic
Spanish Republican Air Force
 Spanish State
Spanish Air Force

South African Air Force

Swiss Air Force

 Soviet Air Force (following the occupation of Baltic States, at least three former Lithuanian Bü 133C's were transferred to aviation of 29th Territorial Infantry Corps)

SFR Yugoslav Air Force - Postwar.

Specifications (Bücker Bü 133C)

See also

References

Notes

Bibliography
 
 
 
 
 König, Erwin. Bücker Bü 133 "Jungmeister"(Flugzeug Profile 29) (in German). D-86669 Stengelheim, Germany: Unitec Medienvertrieb e.K., 
 König, Erwin. Die Bücker-Flugzeuge (The Bücker Aircraft) (bilingual German/English). Martinsried, Germany: Nara Verlag, 1987. .
 König, Erwin. Die Bückers, Die Geschichte der ehemaligen Bücker-Flugzeugbau-GmbH und ihrer Flugzeuge (in German). (1979)
 Mondey, David. The Hamlyn Concise Guide to Axis Aircraft of World War II. London: Chancellor Press Ltd. .
 Smith, J.Richard and Kay, Antony L. German Aircraft of the Second World War. London: Putnam and Company Ltd., 3rd impression 1978, p. 92–93. .
 Wietstruk, Siegfried. Bücker-Flugzeugbau, Die Geschichte eines Flugzeugwerkes (in German). D-82041 Oberhaching, Germany: Aviatik Verlag, 1999. .
 Wood, Tony and Gunston, Bill. Hitler's Luftwaffe: A pictorial history and technical encyclopedia of Hitlers air power in World War II. London: Salamander Books Ltd., 1977, p. 140. .

External links

Photogallery on Airliners.net
Bücker Museum Rangsdorf's online Bü 133C Jungmeister structural detail photos pages
 Bücker Bü 133 page of Smithsonian National Air and Space Museum
Bücker Bü 133 C page of Virginian Aviation Museum

Bu 133, Bucker
Biplanes
Single-engined tractor aircraft
Aerobatic aircraft
Bücker aircraft
Homebuilt aircraft
Aircraft first flown in 1935